Sayın is a surname. Notable people with the surname include:

 Emel Sayın (born 1945), Turkish singer and actress
 Niyazi Sayın (born 1927), Turkish ney flautist and music educator

Turkish-language surnames